Gani Ahmed Nigam (born May 1, 1998), is an Indian professional footballer who plays as a winger for Indian Super League club NorthEast United.

Club career

Gokulam Kerala
He was signed by his hometown club Gokulam Kerala FC and got some game time at the top division league, playing in 5 I-League matches and notching up one goal against Shillong Lajong.

Hyderabad FC

In 2019 he was picked up by Hyderabad FC, and over the course of the season he got only one start in ISL 2019-20 and 4 appearances as a substitute.

Mohammedans SC
Gani Ahmed Nigam has joined Mohammedan Sporting as the 129 year old club aims for a resurgence in the national stage.

NorthEast United 
On 29 October 2021, Gani joined Indian Super League club NorthEast United. He made his debut for the club on 10 December, in their 1–0 defeat to Odisha. By the end of the season he made six appearances for the NorthEast United.

Gani extends his contract with NorthEast United for the 2022–23 season. He scored his first goal for Highlanders against Sudeva Delhi in 2022 Durand Cup.

Career statistics

Honours
Mohammedan Sporting
 I-League 2nd Division: 2019–20

References

External links

1998 births
Living people
Indian footballers
Sportspeople from Kozhikode
Footballers from Kerala
Association football wingers
FC Pune City players
Gokulam Kerala FC players
I-League 2nd Division players
I-League players
Indian Super League players
Hyderabad FC players
Mohammedan SC (Kolkata) players
NorthEast United FC players